Datuk Foo Kok Keong  (born 8 January 1963) is a former badminton player from Malaysia who rated among the world's best singles players from the late 1980s to the mid-1990s. He competed at the 1992 Summer Olympics.

Career 
Not a stylish looking player, he was noted for his quickness, stamina, and never-say-die tenacity. Kok Keong played for the Malaysian Thomas Cup (men's international) team which finished second to China in 1990, and for the team which defeated Indonesia for the world championship in 1992.

His victories in individual competitions included the Singapore Open and French Open singles titles in 1990, and the Asian Championships singles title in 1994. He was a runner-up in the Malaysia Open (1990, 1991), the British Commonwealth Games (1990), the World Grand Prix Final (1989), and the All-England Championships (1991).

In 1991, Foo Kok Keong became the first Malaysian to reach the number 1 world ranking since the system was implemented by the International Badminton Federation (IBF) in the 80's.

Achievements

World Cup 
Men's singles

Asian Championships 
Men's singles

Southeast Asian Games 
Men's singles

Commonwealth Games 
Men's singles

IBF World Grand Prix 
The World Badminton Grand Prix sanctioned by International Badminton Federation (IBF) from 1983 to 2006.

Men's singles

IBF International 
Men's singles

Invitational tournament 
Men's singles

Honours 
  :
  Herald of the Order of Loyalty to the Royal Family of Malaysia (B.S.D.) (1988)
  Member of the Order of the Defender of the Realm (A.M.N.) (1990)
  Officer of the Order of the Defender of the Realm (K.M.N.) (1992)
  Commander of the  Order of Meritorious Service (P.J.N.) – Datuk (2022)
 :
 Recipient of the Meritorious Service Medal (P.J.K.) (1991)

References

External links 
 

1963 births
Living people
People from Selangor
Malaysian sportspeople of Chinese descent
Malaysian male badminton players
Badminton players at the 1992 Summer Olympics
Olympic badminton players of Malaysia
Badminton players at the 1990 Commonwealth Games
Commonwealth Games silver medallists for Malaysia
Commonwealth Games medallists in badminton
Badminton players at the 1982 Asian Games
Badminton players at the 1986 Asian Games
Badminton players at the 1990 Asian Games
Asian Games silver medalists for Malaysia
Asian Games medalists in badminton
Medalists at the 1990 Asian Games
Competitors at the 1983 Southeast Asian Games
Competitors at the 1987 Southeast Asian Games
Competitors at the 1989 Southeast Asian Games
Competitors at the 1991 Southeast Asian Games
Southeast Asian Games gold medalists for Malaysia
Southeast Asian Games silver medalists for Malaysia
Southeast Asian Games bronze medalists for Malaysia
Southeast Asian Games medalists in badminton
World No. 1 badminton players
Heralds of the Order of Loyalty to the Royal Family of Malaysia
Members of the Order of the Defender of the Realm
Officers of the Order of the Defender of the Realm
Commanders of the Order of Meritorious Service
Medallists at the 1990 Commonwealth Games